van der Burgh is a surname. Notable people with the surname include:

Cameron van der Burgh (born 1988), South African swimmer
Hendrick van der Burgh (1627–1664), Dutch painter
Pieter Daniel van der Burgh (1805-1879), Dutch painter

See also
 Van der Burg

Surnames of Dutch origin